Tragogomphus is a genus of dragonflies in the family Gomphidae.

The genus contains the following species:
Tragogomphus aurivillii 
Tragogomphus christinae 
Tragogomphus ellioti 
Tragogomphus mamfei 
Tragogomphus tenaculatus

References

 

Gomphidae
Anisoptera genera
Taxonomy articles created by Polbot